The Pittsburgh Kid is a 1941 American sports film directed by Jack Townley and starring Billy Conn, Jean Parker and Dick Purcell.

The film's sets were designed by the art director John Victor Mackay.

Plot
About to fight his biggest bout, Billy Conn is upset by the death of Pop Mallory, his manager. A boxing promoter, Max Allison, who wants Billy to fight for him, uses daughter Barbara to try to sway him away from Pop's daughter Pat Mallory, who keeps Billy under contract.

An impatient Billy dislikes the way Pat handles his career. Meanwhile, nightclub owner Joe Barton resents the interest his girl Barbara Ellison has been showing Billy, neither knowing nor carry that it's all a ruse on her part on her father's behalf.

Billy finally gets a title shot, thanks to Pat's management and reporter Cliff Halliday's enthusiastic buildup. But when an angry Barton comes to threaten Billy, a gun goes off, Barton is killed and Billy is arrested for his murder. By the time he can get released, Pat isn't there on fight night and Billy's first round goes badly. Barbara rushes to find Pat, convincing her that she belongs in Billy's corner for good.

Cast

References

Bibliography
 Ritchie, Andrew. Ethnicity, Sport, Identity: Struggles for Status. Routledge, 2004.

External links
 

1941 films
1940s sports films
Films directed by Jack Townley
American boxing films
Films set in Pittsburgh
American black-and-white films
Republic Pictures films
Films scored by Paul Sawtell
1940s English-language films
1940s American films